Faramarz Zelli (born 31 December 1940) is a retired Iranian football player who played for Iran national football team in 1966 Asian Games.

Club career
He formerly played for Kian Tehran, PAS Tehran, Taj Tehran and Iran national football team.

References

External links

 Faramarz Zelli at TeamMelli.com

Iranian footballers
Esteghlal F.C. players
Pas players
Living people
Asian Games silver medalists for Iran
Asian Games medalists in football
Footballers at the 1966 Asian Games
1968 AFC Asian Cup players
1940 births
Association football goalkeepers
Medalists at the 1966 Asian Games
Iran international footballers